Ole Johan Olsen (6 December 1884 – 31 May 1939) was a Norwegian politician.

Olsen was born in Kristiansand to firefighter Anton Martin Olsen and Mathilde Fredrikke Pedersen. He was elected representative to the Stortinget for the periods 1928–1930, 1931–1933, 1934–1936 and 1937–1945, for the Labour Party.

References

1884 births
1939 deaths
Politicians from Kristiansand
Labour Party (Norway) politicians
Members of the Storting